David Gray Mulready (born 13 September 1947) is an Australian Anglican bishop and a former incumbent of the diocesan see of North West Australia, the largest diocese in geographical size in the Anglican Church of Australia, covering approximately a quarter of the Australian continent.

Early life

Mulready was born in Sydney, the son of Norman Benson Mulready and Edna Faith Osborne. He grew up on the Northern Beaches in Curl Curl, New South Wales and attended Newington College (1960–1964). He became an airline trainee with Qantas before studying at Moore Theological College and the Melbourne College of Divinity. He holds a Licenciate of Theology and a Diploma of Religious Education.

Ministry
 
Mulready's ordained ministry began in the Diocese of Sydney and he then served 15 years in the Diocese of Armidale. He worked in rural parish ministry in New South Wales and was posted to Tambar Springs (1974–1977), Walgett (1977–1981), Manilla (1981–1985) and Gunnedah (1985–1989). Mulready was the NSW State Secretary of the Bush Church Aid Society from 1989, after which he moved St Stephen's Church, Penrith (1993–2000). He then served as Rector of St John's, Parramatta (2000–2004) until he was elected Bishop of North-West Australia. Mulready was consecrated as bishop in February 2004. He retired in 2011.

Family life
Mulready married Maureen Jane Lawrie in 1972 and is the father of two adult sons and a daughter. He also has 5 grandchildren

References

1947 births
People educated at Newington College
Evangelical Anglican bishops
Clergy from Sydney
Anglican bishops of North West Australia
Living people
Moore Theological College alumni